A.E.S. Hudson Street is an American comedy television show that aired on ABC in 1978 on Thursday night from 9:30 pm to 10:00 pm EST.

Synopsis
The series follows the antics of the staff of a run-down Ambulance Emergency Service hospital on Hudson Street, on the lower west side of Manhattan. It was cancelled after five episodes.

Cast and characters

Pilot
The series pilot aired July 21, 1977, with F. Murray Abraham starring as Dr. Tony Menzies. When the five series episodes were filmed, only Dishy and Stewart remained from the original cast. All of the other characters were either dropped or re-cast. In the pilot, A.E.S. stood for Ambulance Emergency Service.

Remake
The series was remade as Stat in 1991.  That version lasted 6 episodes.

References

External links 
 

1970s American sitcoms
1978 American television series debuts
1978 American television series endings
Television series by Sony Pictures Television
American Broadcasting Company original programming
English-language television shows
Latino sitcoms
Television shows set in Manhattan
1970s American medical television series